The 2016–17 Philippine Basketball Association (PBA) Philippine Cup Finals was the best-of-7 championship series of the 2016–17 PBA Philippine Cup, and the conclusion of the conference's playoffs. The San Miguel Beermen and Barangay Ginebra San Miguel competed for the 39th Philippine Cup championship and the 119th overall championship contested by the league.

The championship series was also the 5th time (first since the 2009 Fiesta Conference Finals) that the two teams met in the finals.

San Miguel won the finals series, four games to one, winning their third straight Philippine Cup championship. The Beermen will also have permanent possession of the second version of the Jun Bernardino Trophy.

Background

San Miguel Beermen
San Miguel is the defending champions of the Philippine Cup for the past two seasons and they are gunning for their third straight Philippine Cup championship. A third straight championship will enable them to keep permanent possession of the Jun Bernardino Trophy.

The Beermen finished the elimination round with a 10–1 record, losing only to the Phoenix Fuel Masters. Their elimination round record assured them of the twice-to-beat advantage into the quarterfinals. They beat the Rain or Shine Elasto Painters, 98–91, to advance to the semifinals facing TNT KaTropa. TNT incidentally was the first team to have permanent possession of the Jun Bernardino Trophy after winning three straight Philippine Cup championships from 2011 to 2013.

San Miguel and TNT endured a seven-game semifinals series, with the Beermen winning the pivotal seventh game, 96–83.

Barangay Ginebra San Miguel
Barangay Ginebra struggled in the first part of the elimination round and finished with a 6–5 record. Due to inferior quotient, the Gin Kings got the 7th seed, having a twice-to-win disadvantage going into the quarterfinals. The faced the Alaska Aces and won two straight games in order for them to advance to the semifinals. The Gin Kings were up against rival Star Hotshots on a Manila Clasico semifinal series. Star won the first two games before Ginebra won the next two games, eventually tying the series, 2–2. In Game 5, Star once again won and Ginebra was on a verge of elimination. Ginebra was able to force a do-or-die seventh game after winning Game 6. Barangay Ginebra eventually won Game 7, 89–76.

The Gin Kings played four do-or-die games (two in the quarterfinals against Alaska and two against Star) before reaching the finals for the second consecutive time since they won the Governors' Cup a season ago.

Road to the finals

Elimination round matchup

Series summary

Game summaries

Game 1

After Ginebra took a 2–1 lead, San Miguel had a 16–0 run and finished the first quarter with a double digit lead, 35–12. The Beermen then pushed the lead as much as 36 points in one point of the game. Ginebra tried to orchestrate a run of their own but they cannot decrease the lead to 25 points, despite the absence of the Beermen's starters in the fourth quarter. Alex Cabagnot, Chris Ross and June Mar Fajardo scored in double figures in the first half.

Game 2

Ginebra was able to pull ahead in the first half of the game, leading by as much as 26 points in the second quarter. San Miguel started their own run at the start of the third quarter. During the scoring run, Marcio Lassiter was given a technical foul and eventually ejected after taunting Sol Mercado upon making a three-point shot. Lassiter was earlier called for a flagrant foul on Kevin Ferrer in the first half.

Nevertheless, San Miguel was able to pull back out and decrease the lead to three points, 85–82, going into the fourth quarter. The Beermen were able to tie the game via a three-point shot from Arwind Santos, 106-all, with 48 seconds remaining in regulation. Japeth Aguilar responded with two free throws shots to give Ginebra a two-point lead. After a San Miguel timeout, Gabby Espinas uncorks a three-point shot, giving them a one-point lead. Ginebra had a chance to regain the lead when Aguilar tried a three-point shot but missed. The Gin Kings were forced to foul Ronald Tubid who split his charity shots. With 3.2 seconds remaining and Ginebra with possession, Joe Devance drove to the basket and missed his layup with Arwind Santos defending the basket. Devance got the rebound and made a follow-up basket before the buzzer sounded to force the game into overtime.

In the extension period, Ginebra made an 8–2 run with three minutes remaining but San Miguel had a 6–0 run from two three point field goals from Ronald Tubid, tying the game again 118-all with 1:40 remaining. Ginebra eventually pulled away with the victory following the scoring run led by Aguilar, Scottie Thompson and Sol Mercado.

Game 3

Ginebra was able to take the lead most in the first half, reaching by as much as 12 points early in the second quarter. San Miguel erased the lead and tied the game at 58-all by the third quarter. The lead went back and forth into the fourth quarter until the Beermen closed out the game with a 12–0 run starting at the 5 minute mark of the game.

Game 4

Prior the game, Beermen's center June Mar Fajardo was awarded his fifth Best Player of the Conference award, tying the record of former Beermen Danny Ildefonso.

San Miguel pulled out in the first five minutes of the game with a 20–2 run. The lead reached up to 26 points in the third quarter. A late game run was orchestrated by Ginebra in the fourth quarter, decreasing the lead to 9 points, 92–83 into the last two minutes of the game. Turnovers by Joe Devance and Mark Caguioa halted a possible Ginebra comeback.

Game 5

San Miguel led most of the game for the first three quarters. Barangay Ginebra was able to decrease the lead to one point, 84–83 after a three-point basket from LA Tenorio, with 2:28 remaining in the game. The Beermen pulled away with the victory after a 7–0 run led by June Mar Fajardo, Chris Ross and Arwind Santos. San Miguel won their third straight Philippine Cup championship in five games.

Chris Ross won the Finals MVP award, with finals averages of 17.2 points, 5.2 rebounds, 9.2 assists and 1.8 steals per game.

Rosters

{| class="toccolours" style="font-size: 95%; width: 100%;"
|-
! colspan="2" style="background-color: #; color: #; text-align: center;" | San Miguel Beermen 2016–17 PBA Philippine Cup roster
|- style="background-color:#; color: #; text-align: center;"
! Players !! Coaches
|-
| valign="top" |
{| class="sortable" style="background:transparent; margin:0px; width:100%;"
! Pos. !! # !! POB !! Name !! Height !! Weight !! !! College
|-

{| class="toccolours" style="font-size: 95%; width: 100%;"
|-
! colspan="2" style="background-color: #; color: #; text-align: center;" | Barangay Ginebra San Miguel 2016–17 PBA Philippine Cup roster
|- style="background-color:#; color: #; text-align: center;"
! Players !! Coaches
|-
| valign="top" |
{| class="sortable" style="background:transparent; margin:0px; width:100%;"
! Pos. !! # !! POB !! Name !! Height !! Weight !! !! College
|-

  Chua also serves as Barangay Ginebra's board governor.

Broadcast notes
The Philippine Cup Finals was aired on TV5 with simulcasts on PBA Rush (both in standard and high definition). TV5's radio arm, Radyo5 currently provides the radio play-by-play coverage.

Sports5 provided online livestreaming via their official YouTube account using the TV5 feed.

The PBA Rush broadcast provided English-language coverage of the Finals.

 Additional Game 5 crew:
 Trophy presentation: Aaron Atayde
 Dugout celebration interviewer: Sel Guevara

References

External links
 PBA official website

2017
2016–17 PBA season
San Miguel Beermen games
Barangay Ginebra San Miguel games
PBA Philippine Cup Finals
PBA Philippine Cup Finals
PBA Philippine Cup Finals 2017